Gustavo Salinas (17 July 1893 – 5 March 1964) was a Mexican sports shooter. He competed in the 25 m rapid fire pistol and the 50 m rifle events at the 1932 Summer Olympics. He also won two golds, three silvers, and two bronze medals at two editions of the Central American and Caribbean Games.

References

External links
 

1893 births
1964 deaths
Mexican male sport shooters
Olympic shooters of Mexico
Shooters at the 1932 Summer Olympics
Place of birth missing